Casey is a city in Adair and Guthrie counties in the U.S. state of Iowa. The population was 387 at the 2020 census.

The Guthrie County portion of Casey is part of the Des Moines – West Des Moines Metropolitan Statistical Area.

History
Casey was platted in 1869.  The community has the name of a railroad man. The firm John and James Casey, Contractors, from Erie, Pennsylvania, under John F. Tracy, President of the Chicago, Rock Island and Pacific, built the railroad across Iowa, and through Casey, from 1866 to 1869. Most of the streets in the town are named for Union Army generals in the American Civil War.

In 2015 the City Clerk, Dorothy Dillinger, was indicted for misappropriation of city funds and burning down the city hall. She stole up to $300,000 in city funds and spent it on purchases at Victoria's Secret and Wal-Mart, among other places. Dillinger pleaded guilty in federal court and received a prison sentence of five years from judge James E. Gritzner. A new city hall and community center, which replaced the one destroyed in an attempt to cover up the embezzlement, had its groundbreaking in 2018. The estimated cost is $1 million. The majority of the building would be dedicated to community center functions.

Geography
Casey is located at  (41.506088, -94.520039).

Demographics

2010 census
As of the census of 2010, there were 426 people, 174 households, and 109 families living in the city. The racial makeup of the city was 96.7% White, 2.1% Asian, and 1.2% from two or more races. Hispanic or Latino of any race were 1.4% of the population.

There were 174 households, of which 30.5% had children under the age of 18 living with them, 44.8% were married couples living together, 12.1% had a female householder with no husband present, 5.7% had a male householder with no wife present, and 37.4% were non-families. 31.6% of all households were made up of individuals, and 16.1% had someone living alone who was 65 years of age or older. The average household size was 2.45 and the average family size was 3.05.

The median age in the city was 44.3 years. 26.1% of residents were under the age of 18; 7.4% were between the ages of 18 and 24; 18.6% were from 25 to 44; 28.6% were from 45 to 64; and 19.2% were 65 years of age or older. The gender makeup of the city was 49.5% male and 50.5% female.

2000 census
As of the census of 2000, there were 478 people, 203 households, and 129 families living in the city. The racial makeup of the city was 98.54% White, 0.84% from other races, and 0.63% from two or more races. Hispanic or Latino of any race were 2.72% of the population.

There were 203 households, out of which 29.1% had children under the age of 18 living with them, 49.3% were married couples living together, 9.4% had a female householder with no husband present, and 36.0% were non-families. 32.0% of all households were made up of individuals, and 19.7% had someone living alone who was 65 years of age or older. The average household size was 2.35 and the average family size was 2.96.

Age spread:  26.8% under the age of 18, 5.4% from 18 to 24, 25.5% from 25 to 44, 18.6% from 45 to 64, and 23.6% who were 65 years of age or older. The median age was 39 years. For every 100 females, there were 92.7 males. For every 100 females age 18 and over, there were 94.4 males.

The median income for a household in the city was $35,000, and the median income for a family was $40,000. Males had a median income of $27,917 versus $24,167 for females. The per capita income for the city was $15,189. About 7.4% of families and 9.2% of the population were below the poverty line, including 10.3% of those under age 18 and 5.7% of those age 65 or over.

Government
Barry Chalfant was elected mayor in 2015 and will serve until 2019.

Education
Casey is in the Adair–Casey Community School District, and students from Casey attend Adair–Casey Elementary School and AC/GC Junior High School in Adair. Students attend AC/GC High School in Guthrie Center, a school of the Guthrie Center Community School District, under a grade-sharing arrangement.

References

External links
  - hosted by the Adair–Casey Community School District

 

Cities in Adair County, Iowa
Cities in Guthrie County, Iowa
Cities in Iowa
Des Moines metropolitan area
1869 establishments in Iowa
Populated places established in 1869